Winning Post is a thoroughbred horse racing simulation game series from Koei Tecmo (originally Koei) debuting in 1993. The series is distinct from Koei's other horse-racing franchise, G1 Jockey, and Tecmo's Gallop Racer series. To date, the only version of the game to be released outside of Japan was the Sega Saturn port of Winning Post EX, released in North America as Winning Post. All of the other games have only been released in Japan.

Games
Winning Post - PC-9801 (January 14, 1993),X68000 (May 28, 1993),Super Famicom (September 10, 1993), Mega CD (September 17, 1993), PC98 (1995), 3DO (September 16, 1994)
Winning Post EX - PlayStation (December 29, 1995), Sega Saturn (August 11, 1995)
Winning Post Advance - Game Boy Advance (March 21, 2001)
Winning Post 2 - Super Famicom (March 18, 1995), PlayStation, Sega Saturn (March 22, 1996)
Winning Post 2: Program '96 - Super Famicom, PlayStation, Sega Saturn (October 4, 1996)
Winning Post 2: Final '97 - PlayStation, Sega Saturn (October 2, 1997)
Winning Post 3 - PlayStation (February 26, 1998), Sega Saturn (April 2, 1998)
Winning Post 3: Program '98 - PlayStation (October 1, 1998), Sega Saturn (December 3, 1998)
Winning Post 4 - PlayStation (September 18, 1999)
Winning Post 4 Program 2000 - PlayStation (March 23, 2000), Dreamcast (March 30, 2000)
Winning Post 4 Maximum - PlayStation 2 (September 28, 2000)
Winning Post 4 Maximum 2001 - PlayStation 2 (March 22, 2001)
Winning Post 5 - PlayStation 2 (December 22, 2001)
Winning Post 5 Maximum 2002 - PlayStation 2 (September 19, 2002)
Winning Post 5 Maximum 2003 - PlayStation 2 ( May 29, 2003)
Winning Post 6 - PlayStation 2
Winning Post 6 with Power-Up Kit - Windows
Winning Post 6 Maximum 2004 - PlayStation 2
Winning Post 6: 2005 Nendoban Related Games - PlayStation 2 - released as a standalone and combined with G1 Jockey 3
Winning Post 6 2006 - PlayStation Portable
Winning Post 6 2008 - PlayStation Portable
Winning Post 7 - PlayStation 2
Winning Post 7 Maximum 2006 - PlayStation 2
Winning Post 7 Maximum 2007 - PlayStation 3, PlayStation 2
Winning Post 7 Maximum 2008 - Windows, Wii, PlayStation 3, PlayStation 2
Winning Post 7 2009 - PlayStation Portable
Winning Post 7 2010 - Windows, PlayStation 3, PlayStation Portable
Winning Post 7 2012 - PlayStation 3, PlayStation Portable
Winning Post 7 2013 - PlayStation 3, PlayStation Portable, PlayStation Vita, Windows
Winning Post World - Windows, Wii, PlayStation 3, PlayStation 2
Winning Post World 2010 - Xbox 360, Wii, PlayStation 3, PlayStation 2
Winning Post 8 - (March 27, 2014)
Winning Post 8 2015 - (March 5, 2015)
Winning Post 8 2016 - Windows, PlayStation 3, PlayStation Vita, PlayStation 4
Winning Post 8 2017 - Windows, PlayStation 3, PlayStation 4, PlayStation Vita, Nintendo Switch (2017)
Winning Post 8 2018 - Windows, PlayStation 4, PlayStation Vita, Nintendo Switch (2018)
Winning Post 9 - Windows, PlayStation 4, Nintendo Switch (2019)
Winning Post 9 2020 - Windows, PlayStation 4, Nintendo Switch (March 11, 2020)
Winning Post 9 2021 - Windows, PlayStation 4, Nintendo Switch (March 18, 2021→April 15)

References

External links
List of Winning Post video games at GameFAQs

Horse racing video games
Video game franchises introduced in 1993
Japan-exclusive video games
Koei Tecmo games
Koei Tecmo franchises
Video games developed in Japan